Yves Censi (born 8 February 1964) was a member of the National Assembly of France.   He represented the first constituency of the Aveyron department, from 2002 to 2017 as a member of the Union for a Popular Movement.

References

People from Rodez
1964 births
Living people
Union for a Popular Movement politicians
Deputies of the 12th National Assembly of the French Fifth Republic
Deputies of the 13th National Assembly of the French Fifth Republic
Deputies of the 14th National Assembly of the French Fifth Republic